Robert Cañedo is a Filipino footballer who plays as a left midfielder for Green Archers United.

Honours

Club
Loyola
 UFL Cup: 2013;

External links

References 

1984 births
Living people
Filipino footballers
Philippines international footballers
Association football wingers
Green Archers United F.C. players
F.C. Meralco Manila players
Footballers from Negros Occidental